Myŏngch'ŏn station is a railway station in North Korea on the P'yŏngra Line of the Korean State Railway. It is also the starting point of the Koch'am Colliery Line.

References

Railway stations in North Korea